The British Rail Class 466 Networker are a fleet of 43 electric multiple units that were built by Metro-Cammell in 1993 and 1994. The units are currently operated by Southeastern.

Description
The Class 466 EMUs were built between 1993 and 1994 by Metro-Cammell in Washwood Heath, for the Network SouthEast sector of British Rail. As part of the privatisation of British Rail, all were sold to Angel Trains. They were operated by Network SouthEast until 1997, and then by Connex South Eastern until 2003, South Eastern Trains until 2006 and Southeastern to the present day.

Class 466 units operate in multiple with Class 465s. They were historically used as individual units on rural routes, mainly the Sheerness Line between Sittingbourne and Sheerness, displacing the Class 508/2s which operated on this branch line and on the Bromley North branch between Grove Park and Bromley North. However, owing to their non-compliance with accessibility standards, since 1 January 2021 they may only run coupled to a Class 465 unit.

The Class 466s were also used on the Medway Valley line between Strood, Maidstone West and Tonbridge, and in the leaf fall and winter season of 2011, the Class 466s were doubled up to make 4 car units on the Medway Valley line to help stop the poor adhesion along the line when only a single unit runs. They also ran doubled up or coupled with a Class 465 on the Sheerness Line during the winters of 2009/10 and 2010/11. From the May 2012 timetable changes, Class 375s replaced the Class 466s on the Medway Valley line and from December 2019 on the Sheerness Branch Line.

These two-car EMUs are formed of a driving motor carriage (DMSO: Driving Motor Standard Open) and a driving trailer carriage (DTSO, with lavatory); all on-board seating is standard accommodation. A Solid State Traction Converter package controls 3-phase AC Traction motors, which allows for Rheostatic or Regenerative Dynamic braking. Primary braking system is electro-pneumatically actuated disc brakes, which is blended with the Dynamic brakes. Speed Probes on every axle of the unit provide for Wheel Slip/Slide Protection. A solid-state Auxiliary Converter provides 110 V DC and 240 V AC supplies; this is the source of the loud buzzing noise which can be heard when the train is stationary. The Aux Converter is located on the driving trailer, along with the toilet. The units use air-operated sliding plug doors.

Some are scheduled to be replaced by Class 707s, with two hauled to Worksop for store by Harry Needle Railroad Company in June 2021.

Refurbishment
The 466s were repainted by Wabtec Rail at Doncaster Works into a variation of Southeastern livery with lilac doors and midnight blue lower band.

Fleet details

Accidents and incidents
On 5 February 2007 a bridge inspection unit working on the M20 motorway was deployed over a railway bridge between Maidstone Barracks and Aylesford stations. The gantry on the bridge inspection unit was struck by 466041 working a Paddock Wood to Gillingham service, causing significant damage to the leading carriage and wrecking the gantry. The train driver and the sole passenger were slightly injured. Nobody was on the gantry at the time.

References

External links

466
Train-related introductions in 1993
750 V DC multiple units